Salvia paramiltiorrhiza is a perennial plant that is native to Anhui and Hubei provinces in China,  growing on hillsides and streamsides. Inflorescences are 4–6 flowered widely spaced verticillasters, with a  corolla that ranges from yellowish to yellow to purple-red

Notes

paramiltiorrhiza
Flora of China